Harpoon is the debut album by Larkin Grimm, released in 2005. Pitchfork's review described it as "delicate, highly stylized folk."

Track listing
"Entrance" – 2:27
"Going Out" – 2:19
"Patch It Up"– 4:58
"Pigeon Food" – 1:54
"I Am Eating Your Deathly Dreams" – 4:30
"One Hundred Men" – 2:45
"Future Friend" – 9:05
"Go Gently" – 1:00
"Harpoon Baptism" – 3:50
"I Killed Someone" – 1:20
"Don't Come Down, Darkness" – 2:57
"Touch Me, Shaping Hands" – 4:27
"White Water" – 3:20

References

2005 albums
Larkin Grimm albums